In software engineering, double-checked locking (also known as "double-checked locking optimization") is a software design pattern used to reduce the overhead of acquiring a lock by testing the locking criterion (the "lock hint") before acquiring the lock.  Locking occurs only if the locking criterion check indicates that locking is required.

The pattern, when implemented in some language/hardware combinations, can be unsafe. At times, it can be considered an anti-pattern.

It is typically used to reduce locking overhead when implementing "lazy initialization" in a multi-threaded environment, especially as part of the Singleton pattern. Lazy initialization avoids initializing a value until the first time it is accessed.

Usage in C++11 
For the singleton pattern, double-checked locking is not needed:

Singleton& GetInstance() {
  static Singleton s;
  return s;
}

C++11 and beyond also provide a built-in double-checked locking pattern in the form of std::once_flag and std::call_once:
#include <mutex>
#include <optional> // Since C++17

// Singleton.h
class Singleton {
 public:
  static Singleton* GetInstance();
 private:
  Singleton() = default;

  static std::optional<Singleton> s_instance;
  static std::once_flag s_flag;
};

// Singleton.cpp
std::optional<Singleton> Singleton::s_instance;
std::once_flag Singleton::s_flag{};

Singleton* Singleton::GetInstance() {
  std::call_once(Singleton::s_flag,
                 []() { s_instance.emplace(Singleton{}); });
  return &*s_instance;
}

If one truly wishes to use the double-checked idiom instead of the trivially working example above (for instance because Visual Studio before the 2015 release did not implement the C++11 standard's language about concurrent initialization quoted above  ), one needs to use acquire and release fences:

#include <atomic>
#include <mutex>

class Singleton {
 public:
  static Singleton* GetInstance();

 private:
  Singleton() = default;

  static std::atomic<Singleton*> s_instance;
  static std::mutex s_mutex;
};

Singleton* Singleton::GetInstance() {
  Singleton* p = s_instance.load(std::memory_order_acquire);
  if (p == nullptr) { // 1st check
    std::lock_guard<std::mutex> lock(s_mutex);
    p = s_instance.load(std::memory_order_relaxed);
    if (p == nullptr) { // 2nd (double) check
      p = new Singleton();
      s_instance.store(p, std::memory_order_release);
    }
  }
  return p;
}

Usage in POSIX 
pthread_once() must be used
to initialize library (or sub-module) code when its API does not have a dedicated initialization 
procedure required to be called in single-threaded mode.

Usage in Go 
package main

import "sync"

var arrOnce sync.Once
var arr []int

// getArr retrieves arr, lazily initializing on first call. Double-checked
// locking is implemented with the sync.Once library function. The first
// goroutine to win the race to call Do() will initialize the array, while
// others will block until Do() has completed. After Do has run, only a
// single atomic comparison will be required to get the array.
func getArr() []int {
	arrOnce.Do(func() {
		arr = []int{0, 1, 2}
	})
	return arr
}

func main() {
	// thanks to double-checked locking, two goroutines attempting to getArr()
	// will not cause double-initialization
	go getArr()
	go getArr()
}

Usage in Java 

// Single-threaded version
class Foo {
    private static Helper helper;
    public Helper getHelper() {
        if (helper == null) {
            helper = new Helper();
        }
        return helper;
    }

    // other functions and members...
}

The problem is that this does not work when using multiple threads. A lock must be obtained in case two threads call getHelper() simultaneously. Otherwise, either they may both try to create the object at the same time, or one may wind up getting a reference to an incompletely initialized object.

The lock is obtained by expensive synchronizing, as is shown in the following example.

// Correct but possibly expensive multithreaded version
class Foo {
    private Helper helper;
    public synchronized Helper getHelper() {
        if (helper == null) {
            helper = new Helper();
        }
        return helper;
    }

    // other functions and members...
}

However, the first call to getHelper() will create the object and only the few threads trying to access it during that time need to be synchronized; after that all calls just get a reference to the member variable.
Since synchronizing a method could in some extreme cases decrease performance by a factor of 100 or higher, the overhead of acquiring and releasing a lock every time this method is called seems unnecessary: once the initialization has been completed, acquiring and releasing the locks would appear unnecessary. Many programmers have attempted to optimize this situation in the following manner:

 Check that the variable is initialized (without obtaining the lock). If it is initialized, return it immediately.
 Obtain the lock.
 Double-check whether the variable has already been initialized: if another thread acquired the lock first, it may have already done the initialization. If so, return the initialized variable.
 Otherwise, initialize and return the variable.

// Broken multithreaded version
// "Double-Checked Locking" idiom
class Foo {
    private Helper helper;
    public Helper getHelper() {
        if (helper == null) {
            synchronized (this) {
                if (helper == null) {
                    helper = new Helper();
                }
            }
        }
        return helper;
    }

    // other functions and members...
}

Intuitively, this algorithm is an efficient solution to the problem if the runtime has a fence primitive (which manages memory visibility across execution units), otherwise the algorithm should be avoided. For example, consider the following sequence of events:

 Thread A notices that the value is not initialized, so it obtains the lock and begins to initialize the value.
 Due to the semantics of some programming languages, the code generated by the compiler is allowed to update the shared variable to point to a partially constructed object before A has finished performing the initialization. For example, in Java if a call to a constructor has been inlined then the shared variable may immediately be updated once the storage has been allocated but before the inlined constructor initializes the object.
 Thread B notices that the shared variable has been initialized (or so it appears), and returns its value. Because thread B believes the value is already initialized, it does not acquire the lock. If B uses the object before all of the initialization done by A is seen by B (either because A has not finished initializing it or because some of the initialized values in the object have not yet percolated to the memory B uses (cache coherence)), the program will likely crash.

One of the dangers of using double-checked locking in J2SE 1.4 (and earlier versions) is that it will often appear to work: it is not easy to distinguish between a correct implementation of the technique and one that has subtle problems. Depending on the compiler, the interleaving of threads by the scheduler and the nature of other concurrent system activity, failures resulting from an incorrect implementation of double-checked locking may only occur intermittently. Reproducing the failures can be difficult.

As of J2SE 5.0, this problem has been fixed. The volatile keyword now ensures that multiple threads handle the singleton instance correctly.

// Works with acquire/release semantics for volatile in Java 1.5 and later
// Broken under Java 1.4 and earlier semantics for volatile
class Foo {
    private volatile Helper helper;
    public Helper getHelper() {
        Helper localRef = helper;
        if (localRef == null) {
            synchronized (this) {
                localRef = helper;
                if (localRef == null) {
                    helper = localRef = new Helper();
                }
            }
        }
        return localRef;
    }

    // other functions and members...
}

Note the local variable "", which seems unnecessary. The effect of this is that in cases where  is already initialized (i.e., most of the time), the volatile field is only accessed once (due to "" instead of ""), which can improve the method's overall performance by as much as 40 percent.

Java 9 introduced the  class, which allows use of relaxed atomics to access fields, giving somewhat faster reads on machines with weak memory models, at the cost of more difficult mechanics and loss of sequential consistency (field accesses no longer participate in the synchronization order, the global order of accesses to volatile fields).

// Works with acquire/release semantics for VarHandles introduced in Java 9
class Foo {
    private volatile Helper helper;

    public Helper getHelper() {
        Helper localRef = getHelperAcquire();
        if (localRef == null) {
            synchronized (this) {
                localRef = getHelperAcquire();
                if (localRef == null) {
                    localRef = new Helper();
                    setHelperRelease(localRef);
                }
            }
        }
        return localRef;
    }

    private static final VarHandle HELPER;
    private Helper getHelperAcquire() {
        return (Helper) HELPER.getAcquire(this);
    }
    private void setHelperRelease(Helper value) {
        HELPER.setRelease(this, value);
    }

    static {
        try {
            MethodHandles.Lookup lookup = MethodHandles.lookup();
            HELPER = lookup.findVarHandle(Foo.class, "helper", Helper.class);
        } catch (ReflectiveOperationException e) {
            throw new ExceptionInInitializerError(e);
        }
    }

    // other functions and members...
}

If the helper object is static (one per class loader), an alternative is the initialization-on-demand holder idiom (See Listing 16.6 from the previously cited text.)
// Correct lazy initialization in Java
class Foo {
    private static class HelperHolder {
       public static final Helper helper = new Helper();
    }

    public static Helper getHelper() {
        return HelperHolder.helper;
    }
}

This relies on the fact that nested classes are not loaded until they are referenced.

Semantics of  field in Java 5 can be employed to safely publish the helper object without using :

public class FinalWrapper<T> {
    public final T value;
    public FinalWrapper(T value) {
        this.value = value;
    }
}

public class Foo {
   private FinalWrapper<Helper> helperWrapper;

   public Helper getHelper() {
      FinalWrapper<Helper> tempWrapper = helperWrapper;

      if (tempWrapper == null) {
          synchronized (this) {
              if (helperWrapper == null) {
                  helperWrapper = new FinalWrapper<Helper>(new Helper());
              }
              tempWrapper = helperWrapper;
          }
      }
      return tempWrapper.value;
   }
}

The local variable  is required for correctness: simply using  for both null checks and the return statement could fail due to read reordering allowed under the Java Memory Model. Performance of this implementation is not necessarily better than the  implementation.

Usage in C# 

Double-checked locking can be implemented efficiently in .NET. A common usage pattern is to add double-checked locking to Singleton implementations:

public class MySingleton
{
    private static object _myLock = new object();
    private static MySingleton _mySingleton = null;

    private MySingleton() { }

    public static MySingleton GetInstance()
    {
        if (_mySingleton is null) // The first check
        {
            lock (_myLock)
            {
                if (_mySingleton is null) // The second (double) check
                {
                    _mySingleton = new MySingleton();
                }
            }
        }

        return _mySingleton;
    }
}

In this example, the "lock hint" is the _mySingleton object which is no longer null when fully constructed and ready for use.

In .NET Framework 4.0, the Lazy<T> class was introduced, which internally uses double-checked locking by default (ExecutionAndPublication mode) to store either the exception that was thrown during construction, or the result of the function that was passed to Lazy<T>:

public class MySingleton
{
    private static readonly Lazy<MySingleton> _mySingleton = new Lazy<MySingleton>(() => new MySingleton());

    private MySingleton() { }

    public static MySingleton Instance => _mySingleton.Value;
}

See also 
 The Test and Test-and-set idiom for a low-level locking mechanism.
 Initialization-on-demand holder idiom for a thread-safe replacement in Java.

References

External links 
 Issues with the double checked locking mechanism captured in Jeu George's Blogs
 "Double Checked Locking" Description from the Portland Pattern Repository
 "Double Checked Locking is Broken" Description from the Portland Pattern Repository
 Paper "C++ and the Perils of Double-Checked Locking" (475 KB) by Scott Meyers and Andrei Alexandrescu
 Article "Double-checked locking: Clever, but broken" by Brian Goetz
 Article "Warning! Threading in a multiprocessor world" by Allen Holub
 Double-checked locking and the Singleton pattern
 Singleton Pattern and Thread Safety
 volatile keyword in VC++ 2005
 Java Examples and timing of double check locking solutions
 

Concurrency control
Software design patterns
Articles with example Java code